Annamanum griseolum is a species of beetle in the family Cerambycidae. It was described by Henry Walter Bates in 1884, originally under the genus Uraecha. It is known from Japan.

References

Annamanum
Beetles described in 1884